John Gordon Williamson (4 April 1936 – 25 January 2023) was an English cricketer active from 1958 to 1974 who played for Northamptonshire (Northants) in the 1959 to 1962 seasons.

Williamson was born in Norton-on-Tees, Durham on 4 April 1936. He appeared in 56 first-class matches as a righthanded batsman who bowled right arm fast medium pace. He scored 820 runs with a highest score of 106 not out and took 120 wickets with a best performance of six for 47. Williamson played for Durham and Cheshire in the Minor Counties Championship. In 1965, he changed his surname to Barkass-Williamson. Williamson later lived in Solihull, and died on 25 January 2023, at the age of 86.

References

1936 births
2023 deaths
English cricketers
Northamptonshire cricketers
Durham cricketers
Combined Services cricketers
Cheshire cricketers
People from Norton, County Durham